Mariano Hood and Sebastián Prieto were the defending champions, but lost in the quarterfinals to Devin Bowen and Alberto Martín.

Tomás Carbonell and Martín García won the title after Pablo Albano and Marc-Kevin Goellner were forced to withdraw the final match.

Seeds

Draw

Draw

References

External links
 Official results archive (ATP)
 Official results archive (ITF)

Campionati Internazionali di Sicilia
2000 ATP Tour
Camp